In Brazilian politics, the centrão ( – ) refers to a group of political parties that do not have a specific or consistent ideological orientation and aim at ensuring proximity to the executive branch in order to guarantee advantages and allow them to distribute privileges through clientelistic networks. Despite its name, the centrão is not a centrist political group, generally composed of parliamentarians from the "" and big tent parties, who act according to their own interests, linked to cronyism and logrolling.

History

The term has its origin in the 1987 Constituent Assembly, being used to designate a group of parties with a center-right profile that united to support then-president José Sarney with the objective of fighting the proposals of Ulysses Guimarães' supporters — accused of being progressive — for the text of the new Constitution. Five parties made up the centrão at that time: the PFL, PL, PDS,  and PTB, as well as parts of the PMDB. The centrist congressmen managed to change the way the text was approved by negotiating support in exchange for positions and benefits. On June 2, 1988, they also managed to approve Sarney's five-year term.

The centrão would gain prominence again with the formation of the "blocão" (big bloc), a group created in 2014 by Eduardo Cunha, then leader of the PMDB, due to the dissatisfaction of the ruling base deputies with President Dilma Rousseff, who paid little attention to political articulation with the parliamentarians. The blocão brought together eight parties (PSC, PP, PROS, PMDB, PTB, PR, and Solidarity), which totaled 242 congressmen (47% of the Chamber). Cunha's influence over this group of deputies would result in his  in first round to the presidency of the Chamber of Deputies in February 2015. The group would become the main political force in the Chamber of Deputies and a grouping for the so-called "BBB Bench".

2018 elections
In the 2018 elections, the PSDB presidential candidate, Geraldo Alckmin, put together a coalition with parties from the centrão to get more time for electoral propaganda.

After the elections, one of the parties of the centrão, the MDB (formerly PMDB), had a reduction in Federal Senate seats. The former president, Eunício Oliveira, came third in Ceará, Senator Edison Lobão, and former Ministers of Mines and Energy, Garibaldi Alves, former Minister of Tourism, and Romero Jucá did not get reelected.

In the Chamber of Deputies, with the influence of presidential candidate Jair Bolsonaro, the PSL managed to elect 52 federal deputies, which caused a considerable change in the composition of the Chamber. The MDB, until then the leader of the bloc, lost almost half of its seats compared to the 2014 election (from 66 to 34).

The centrists have reorganized themselves around the figures of congressman and mayor Rodrigo Maia (DEM-RJ), majority leader Aguinaldo Ribeiro (PP-PB), and the leader of the Progressives, congressman Arthur Lira (PP-AL). In June 2020, Arthur published an article in Folha de S.Paulo describing the centrão as a moderating force and a guarantee of institutional predictability and governability.

Due to the significant shrinking of the bench, the PSDB (from 54 to 29) is now part of the group, joining the Democrats.

In May 2019, the Chamber of Deputies banned the use of the name "centrão" on Chamber radio and TV, as it considered the term pejorative.

Members 
The following parties have generally been considered to be part of the centrão.

References

External links
Centrão - Centro de Pesquisa e Documentação de História Contemporânea do Brasil (CPDOC), of FGV

Political history of Brazil
Political terminology